Papiya Sengupta is an Indian television actress, who has appeared in Hindi television series, like Pyaar Kii Ye Ek Kahaani, Savdhaan India, Fear Files: Darr Ki Sacchi Tasvirein and Anamika. She appeared in Yeh Kahan Aa Gaye Hum. She played Uma Prithvi Singh Suryavanshi in the TV series Qayamat Ki Raat and lives at Chembur.

Television
Zee TV's Campus (1993-1997)
Sony TV's O Maria (1995-1996) as Pearlie
Doordarshan's  Krishna  (1993-1994) as Lalita, Radha's best friend
Zee TV's Janbaaz (1997) 
Star One's Pyaar Kii Ye Ek Kahaani  2010-2011 as Madhu Dobriyal
Life OK's Savdhaan India
Zee TV's Fear Files: Darr Ki Sacchi Tasvirein
Sony TV's Anamika as Shalaka
Sony TV's Main Naa Bhoolungi as Sunaina Jaggnath
Sony TV's Bharat Ka Veer Putra - Maharana Pratap as Madhlsa Bai
&TV's Yeh Kahan Aa Gaye Hum as Sonali Sabharwal
Star Plus's Chandra Nandini as Rajmata Moora
Alif Laila as Princess Gulafsha (The Street man and the Giant and Aladdin & Wonder Lamp)
Star Plus's Qayamat Ki Raat as Uma Singh Sooryavanshi
Zee TV's Brahmarakshas as Shalini Sharma 2020-2021
 Shubh Shagun as Kanika

References

External links

Living people
Indian television actresses
Actresses in Hindi television
Year of birth missing (living people)